Coburn is an unincorporated community in Buncombe County, North Carolina, United States. Coburn is located along US 74, West of  Candler and East of  Canton. At one time, Coburn was a whistle stop for the Southern Railway on the Murphy Branch.

References

External links
 USGS: Coburn

Unincorporated communities in Buncombe County, North Carolina
Unincorporated communities in North Carolina